1974 London bombing may refer to:
1974 London pillar box bombings
1974 Chelsea bombing
1974 Houses of Parliament bombing
1974 Tower of London bombing
Brook's Club bomb attack
Harrow School bombing
Oxford Street bombing
Bombing of the Kings Arms, Woolwich